The Aceh Medal was founded by King William III of the Netherlands on May 12, 1874, in a royal decree.  The medal was presented to troops participating in the First Aceh Expedition and the Second Aceh Expedition.

Criteria
All soldiers participating in the First Aceh Expedition and/or the first six months of the Second Aceh Expedition were entitled award of the medal under Royal Decree No. 9 of May 12, 1874. Officially this was called the Aceh Medal 1873-1874, but because the purpose of the operation was to take the Kraton, the medal is also known as the Kraton-medaille.

The recipients of the Aceh medal were also entitled to the Expedition Cross with Atjeh 1873-1874 clasp. This provision in the Royal Decree of April 24, 1875, is contrary to the applicable rule in the Netherlands for a single fact no more than one medal may be awarded.

The medal was awarded to the Ensign of the 9th Infantry Battalion, Netherlands Indies Army.

Design
The Aceh medal is circular and made of gilt bronze. The bronze for the medals comes from the craton captured bronze cannons. The obverse shows the right facing effigy of King William III of the Netherlands, Grand Duke of Luxembourg, with the inscription WILLEM III KONING DER NEDERLANDEN GHVL (WILLIAM III King of the Netherlands Grand Duke of Luxembourg). The reverse of the medal bears the inscription ATJEH 1873 EN 1874 surrounded by a wreath of laurel and oak leaves. Originally, the medal bore the inscription entitled ATCHIN 1873 EN 1874. A Royal Decree dated August 28, 1874, changed it to the last title.

The ribbon is 37 mm wide, as is usual in the Netherlands, and was originally dark orange.  A Royal Decree dated April 24, 1875, the changed the color to "Nassau blue".

Recipients 
 Johan Cornelis van der Wijck

Sources 
 Dr. W.F. Bax, "Ridderorden, eereteekenen, draagteekens en penningen, betreffende de Weermacht van Nederland en Koloniën (1813-heden)", 1973
 H.G. Meijer, C.P. Mulder en B.W. Wagenaar, "Orders and Decorations of The Netherlands", 1984

External links
 Afbeelding op 
 Atjeh or Kraton medal 1873-1874

Military awards and decorations of the Netherlands
Aceh War
1874 establishments in the Netherlands
Military awards and decorations of the Royal Netherlands East Indies Army